The traje de flamenca ("flamenco outfit") or traje de gitana ("Gitana outfit") is the dress traditionally worn by women at Ferias (festivals) in Andalusia, Spain.  There are two forms:  one worn by dancers and the other worn as a day dress.

The day dress is body-hugging to mid-thigh, and then continues in multiple layers of ruffles to the ankle.  Modern interpretations of the style are difficult to walk in, let alone dance.   The dancers' version therefore flares out from higher on the hip to allow freedom of movement.

Both versions are trimmed with  layers of ruffles on both the skirt and sleeves.

Traditionally, the outfit is completed with a shawl (mantón de Manila) worn over the shoulders. The traditional dancer will also wear her hair in a bun adorned with flowers, and perhaps a decorative hair comb.

The outfit is attributed to the Gitanos (Roma people of Spain), but is now generally thought of as typically Andalusian. It is also worn by chulapas in Madrid. The outfit originated in the late 19th and early 20th centuries when women vendors dressed in modest calico gowns trimmed with ruffles came to the fairs along with livestock traders. In time, women of the propertied classes copied these outfits. Ever since the Seville Exposition of 1929, the traje de flamenca has had a status as the official outfit of the event.

Fashion

The traje de flamenca has undergone changes over the century or more that it has been in widespread use. For example, in the 1960s and '70s, the skirts became shorter, with skirts reaching only to the middle of the calf or even to the knee (the so-called Marisol style). Beginning in the 1970s, the frogs are dropped back to the ankle so that they are not distracting on the legs.

Madonna wore a flamenco dress in the video for her 1987 signature song La Isla Bonita. This was her first song to have a Latino influence and was a tribute to the beauty of the Latin people according to Madonna. Following its release, the video achieved worldwide popularity, and the flamenco red dress she wore became a trend later.

In the early 21st century there are a wide variety of designs of traje de flamenca for women and girls. They come in a variety of colors, plain or patterned, with short or long sleeves, and more or fewer ruffles. This folkloric outfit has inspired numerous Spanish and international fashion designers, among them Victorio & Lucchino, who have their own line of trajes de flamenca. Others who have been influenced include Yves Saint Laurent, John Galliano, Valentino Garavani, and Tom Ford.

New designs in trajes de flamenca ae shown annually at the Salón Internacional de la Moda Flamenca (SIMOF), which celebrated its 15th year in 2009. The event takes place at the start of the year in Seville. In 2009, 32 designers showed 1,200 different outfits; there were also fashion accessories from 90 firms.

Notes

Andalusian culture
Flamenco
Spanish clothing